Lieutenant General Krishna Mohan Seth retired as the Adjutant General of Indian Army and was the Governor of Chhattisgarh, Madhya Pradesh and Tripura.

Personal life
Krishna Mohan Seth was born on December 19, 1939 in Allahabad. He is married to Veena and they have two sons.

Military career
Lieutenant General Seth was commissioned in the Regiment of Artillery of the Indian Army. He commanded the 17 (Parachute) Field Regiment between March 1979 and October 1980.

He commanded XXI Strike Corps at Bhopal, following which he was picked to command III Corps in Nagaland between October 1994 and October 1995. He was then appointed the Adjutant General. He retired on 31 December 1997.

Political career
He was the Governor of Tripura from 23 June 2000 to 31 May 2003. This was followed by a tenure as the Governor of Chhattisgarh between 2 June 2003	and 25 January 2007. The Counter Terrorism and Jungle Warfare School in Kanker, Chhattisgarh was the brainchild of General Seth during his tenure.

He was the acting Governor of Madhya Pradesh between 2 May 2004 and 29 June 2004.

Major Decorations
He was awarded the Ati Vishisht Seva Medal in 1985 for contribution towards countering terrorist activities in Ukhrul district of Manipur. 
He was awarded Param Vishisht Seva Medal in 1996 for excellence in services in all fields of the armed forces, specially for contribution towards counter insurgency operation in Nagaland, Manipur, Mizoram and Tripura.

He is also the life member of International Film And Television Club of Asian Academy Of Film & Television.

References 

Indian generals
People from Uttar Pradesh
Politicians from Allahabad
Governors of Chhattisgarh
Governors of Madhya Pradesh
Governors of Tripura
Living people
1939 births